Jeremiah M. Hurley (August 28, 1840 – December 21, 1923) was a farmer, cheese maker and political figure in Ontario. He represented Hastings East in the House of Commons of Canada from 1896 to 1900 as a Liberal.

He was born in Prince Edward County, Upper Canada, being the son of Irish immigrant Denis Hurley and Anna O'Brien. Hurley was president of the Thurlow Cheese and Butter Factory. In 1871, he married Ellen Donovan. Hurley farmed and raised livestock. He served twelve years as a member of the council for Hastings County and was reeve for Thurlow Township. Hurley was defeated when he ran for reelection in 1900. He died in Belleville at the age of 83.

References 

Members of the House of Commons of Canada from Ontario
Liberal Party of Canada MPs
1840 births
1923 deaths
People from Prince Edward County, Ontario